The Wascopam Mission or Dalles Mission was a branch of the Methodist Mission active in the Pacific Northwest. It was the first post established outside the Willamette Valley, opened at Celilo Falls along the Columbia River on March 21, 1838, by Reverends Daniel Lee and Henry K. W. Perkins.

Establishment

Lumber for the buildings was cut mostly by neighboring Wascos and the mission was often called Wascopam after them. The mission consisted of a schoolhouse, garden, stable, barn, and two dwellings along with a cleared pasture adjacent to the wood huts used by the Native American villagers. Supplies were procured from Hudson's Bay Company stations Fort Vancouver and Fort Nez Percés along with the Methodist stations of Mission Bottom and later Mission Mill with Chinookan and Walla Walla escorts. During one such trip the provisions for the party had dwindled and a horse had to be consumed until salmon could be purchased from a Clackamas village. The main tribes proselytized to from this location were the Walla Wallas, the Wascos, the Wishram, the Klickitats, the Cascades, and the Shastas. Missionaries used Pulpit Rock to preach to the natives and was at first successful in converting some.

Pulpit Rock

Prior to European American settlement, the rock was carved by natural elements in an open area on a slight slope. The Methodist missionaries were known to preach to the local Native Americans during the 1830s and 1840s from this rock. The rock currently stands in the intersection of E. 12th and Court streets, directly south of The Dalles-Wahtonka High School, with a historical marker. The city kept the rock at its location in the middle of a street due to history surrounding the rock. A mural on a building in downtown The Dalles features the rock prior to the development of the current roads and neighborhood around it.

Closing
The Wascopam Mission was sold for $600 to Marcus Whitman in 1847, who intended to move there. However after the Whitman massacre and the eruption of the Cayuse War, the mission was occupied by the Oregon militia. The station was returned to the Methodist Mission in 1849, and as the ABCFM had yet to be pay for the station, its bill of purchase was waived. The Dalles mission did not get used again by the Methodists, and it was sold to the Federal Government for $24,000.

The U.S. Army developed Fort Dalles during the 1850s on the site of the Wascopam Mission, becoming the center of modern town of The Dalles. The remaining indigenous people inhabiting the surrounding region were evicted by the U.S. Army to the Warm Springs Indian Reservation. During litigation that reached the Supreme Court in 1883 between the church and settlers in the area, the Methodists land claims of the Dalles were rejected. Three years later the church gave $23,000 to settlers who had previously paid for lots on the now defunct claim.

Citations

Bibliography

 

 

 

 

History of Christianity in the United States
Methodism in Oregon
Methodist Mission in Oregon
Oregon Country
Pre-statehood history of Oregon